Rexville may refer to:

Rexville, Indiana, an unincorporated community in Ripley County
Rexville, Texas, an unincorporated area in Austin County